Phaloe is a genus of moths in the subfamily Arctiinae. The genus was erected by Félix Édouard Guérin-Méneville in 1838.

Species
Phaloe cruenta (Hübner, 1823)
Phaloe cubana (Herrich-Schäffer, 1866)
Phaloe ignita (Butler, [1870])
Phaloe lorzae (Boisduval, 1870)
Phaloe pyste Druce, 1885
Phaloe vespertilio Dognin, 1911
Phaloe vogli Daniel, 1966

References

External links

Arctiinae